Violette Safadi is a Lebanese politician, television personality and social activist. She is a former Minister of State for Economic Empowerment of Women and Youth in the cabinet led by H.E. Saad Hariri, Former Prime Minister of the Lebanese Republic.

Career 
Prior to her governmental appointment in 2019, she served as the Executive Director of the Safadi Group Holding where she managed and oversaw work related to several companies involved in different sectors, including aviation, real estate, and trade. Between 2000 and 2011, Safadi worked as a TV presenter at the Lebanese Broadcasting Corporation (LBC), and then as a news anchor and political host at Murr Television (MTV). She honed her talents in public affairs as a consultant in the Ministry of Economy and Trade between 2010 and 2011 and then in the Ministry of Finance between 2011 and 2014.

Violette's activities in the nonprofit sector focus on improving the livelihoods of vulnerable populations through her capacity as president of the Safadi Cultural Foundation and as vice-president of Safadi Foundation. These development-focused organizations focus on creating economic opportunities, women's empowerment and education and training. In conjunction, she has expanded the outreach of cultural events of the Safadi Cultural Center, which she currently heads, to be more inclusive of local demographics including age, gender, and ethnicity.

Violette is an International Council Member of Belfer Center for Science and International Affairs (https://www.belfercenter.org/person/violette-khairallah-safadi), a member of the Women Leadership Board at Harvard Kennedy School; a member of Board of Trustees at Notre Dame University – Louaize; a board member of the Human rights Center at Beirut Arab University; Vice President of the Autism Awareness Association in Lebanon.

Violette holds an undergraduate degree in International Business Management from Notre Dame University Louaize (2004) and is currently pursuing an MA in International Affairs at King's College. In addition, she holds an Executive Certificate in Public Leadership at Harvard Kennedy School of Government (2019).

Personal life 
Violette is married to the H.E. Mohammad Safadi, a  businessman and former government minister. She has two children. She Lives in London with her two sons.

References

External links
Exclusive Interview with H.E. Violette Khairallah Safadi

1981 births
Living people
Lebanese politicians
Lebanese television presenters
Lebanese women television presenters
Lebanese journalists
Lebanese women journalists
Notre Dame University–Louaize alumni
Lebanese women in business
People from Aley District
Greek Orthodox Christians from Lebanon

Future Movement politicians